Uttama Chola also known as Madhurantaka, was a Chola Emperor who ruled from 980 CE to 985 CE in present-day Tamil Nadu, India. According to Tiruvalangadu plates of Rajendra Chola, Madhurantaka Uttama Chola's reign is placed after Aditya II. The latter may have been a co-regent of Parantaka II and seems to have died before he could formally ascend the throne. Uttama was the cousin of Parantaka II and was the son of the illustrious Sembiyan Mahadevi and Gandaraditya.

Controversial ascension 

The circumstances under which Uttama ascended the Chola throne is surrounded by controversy and mystery. At the time of Gandaraditya's death Uttama must have been a very young child. Due to his young age, his rights to the Chola throne were probably set aside and Gandaraditya's younger brother Arinjaya was crowned king.

Arinjaya ruled for a very short time – possibly for less than a year and on his death, his son Parantaka II (Sundara Chola) succeeded him. By the time Madhurantaka was old enough to claim the crown, Sundara Chola had two sons – Aditya Karikalan (the one who took the head of the Vira Pandya) and Arulmozhivarman.

During the reign of Parantaka Chola II, his son, Aditya II, was made the co-regent and heir apparent to the Chola throne even though Uttama Chola,  had more right to throne. Aditya II was assassinated c. 969 CE under mysterious circumstances. As per the Thiruvalangadu plates of Rajendra Chola I there was question on ascension and Arulmozhivarman, the future Rajaraja I, chose to step aside for his paternal uncle Madhurantaka Uttama Chola. According to the Tiruvalangadu plates, after the death of Aditya Chola II, the people wanted Arulmozhivarman - Aditya Chola II's brother to be their king, but the prince refused.

Role in Aditya II’s Assassination 
We learn from an inscription dated during Rajaraja's time that the properties of some persons were confiscated as they had been convicted for treason. It is 
also shown that these persons were involved in the conspiracy to kill Aditya II. The inscription from Udaiyargudi dated in the second regnal year of Rajaraja Chola states that the government confiscated the lands of a few people and their relatives, namely Soman, Ravidasan alias Panchavan Brahmadhirajan, Parameswaran alias Irumudichola Brahmadhirajan and Malaiyanur Revadasa Kramavittan and the properties of his son and mother for treason and for their hand in the murder of Karikala chola who took the head of the Pandya. Among these Ravidasan and Parameswaran were government officials We can safely gather that although Aditya II was killed in 969 C.E., no action had been taken by Uttama during his reign to bring justice to the perpetrators. K.A.N. Sastry in his authoritative Colas says that based on an inscription at the temple at Udayarkudi, circumstantial evidence pointed to Uttama's culpability in the assassination.

However, later research indicates that Sastry may be wrong in this claim, and possibly interpreted the Tamil inscriptions incorrectly. It seems reasonable to conclude that if there was any evidence against Uttama Chola, Rajaraja's son Rajendra would not have assumed the coronation name of Madhurathaka II.

There is every indication Uttama was religious and upstanding. An ardent Shiva devotee (as seen by inscriptions in Konnerirajapuram aka Thirunallam or in Kanchipuram), it was Uttama, under the guidance of his mother, who codified the temple patterns, epigraphy, art, sculpture, and the keeping of administrative records.

Chola army and campaigns 
Not much is known about the military conquests of Uttama (Rashtrakuta) but by his time most of Thondaimandalam had been recovered from the Rashtrakutas. His dominions included Kanchi and Tiruvannamalai to the north. Many of his inscriptions are found in around Chengalpattu and North Arcot districts. The Chola army seems to have been in continued battles with the Pandyas and their ally the Sinhalas in Eelam or Sri Lanka. Several Chola coins of Uttama have been found in the Pandya country and in Eelam as proof of Uttama's activities there. We have a copper-plate inscription of him, now at the Government Museum Chennai. It bears the symbol of a seated tiger with two fish beside it and bears the line This is the matchless edict of the King who taught justice to all the Kings in his realm. But the genealogical section of the plates was lost. However, we do have the appendix portion at the end.

There are indications he upgraded the army, not just in troop levels but also in quality and organization. It is known through inscriptions that, at least from Uttama Chola's time, warriors were provided with waistcoats of armour.

An important general during his reign was Paluvettaraiyar Maravan Kandanar, who also served under Sundara Chola. His son Kumaran Maravan also served Uttama Chola.

Personal life 

Uttama Chola was the son of Sembiyan Mahadevi and Gandaraditya Chola. Sembiyan Mahadevi was the daughter of a Malavarayar chieftain.
Uttama Chola had several queens. The names of some of them are known; Orattanan (Urattayana) Sorabbaiyar Tribhuvana-Mahadeviyar (chief queen), Kaduvettigal Nandippottairaiyar (probably a Pallava princess), and Siddhavadavan Suttiyar (related to Vikramasola-Miladudaiyar a prominent feudal king who ruled over Miladu part of present South Arcot District). His father named him  Gandan Madhurantakan alias Uttama Chola after his paternal uncles. Unlike some of the other kings of the Chola empire, he took after his mother and was very pious. It was due to his pious nature and support that his mother Sembiyan Madevi was able to continue with her own work of rebuilding temples. He is known to have shown compassion to even his enemies.

As with most ancient Indian kings, Uttama Chola was religiously tolerant. Although a Saivaite (worshipper of Siva), he also donated to temples dedicated for Vishnu especially to the Ullagaladar temple. He also granted large degrees of autonomy to his districts. He brought in best talent from other kingdoms. Kachipeedu (modern Kanchipuram) is also mentioned as one of his prominent cities. He is known to have contributed money, cattle, sheep to temples in modern Kumbakonam, Thirunallam (modern Konnerirajapuram), Thiruvallarai, Thirupatturai, Thirunedugalam, Thiruvisalur, Thirunaraiyur, Thiruvalangadu, Thirukkodika, etc.

Uttama Chola's mother pioneered the process of kalpani—converting brick, mortar, and wooden structures into granite and there is inscriptional evidence to show that he actively funded his mother in this work. She made a conscious effort to copy the older inscriptions before she re-built the temple, for example in a temple in Aavatuturai which was sung by the Moovar, that is the Saivite saints, Appar, Sundarar and Sambandhar there is an older inscription from the time before the temple was rebuilt. At other places like the Choleeswara temple at Kurralam which was sung by Appar and Sundarar, there is an inscription that says it was built by Sembiyan Mahadevi She survived this king and lived on for another 16 years into the reign of Rajaraja I.

Two sculptures of Uttama Chola (Madhuranthaka Devar) and his mother can be found in the Southern wall of the inner Prakara of the Konnerirajapuram (aka Thirunallam) temple near Kumbakonam. The inscription under the sculpture identifying Sembiyan Mahadevi identifies her and the Archaeological Survey of India interprets the bearded man behind her as Gandaraditya Chola.

Death and succession 
Uttama died c. 985 CE. Although he had at least one son (Madhurantaka Gandaraditya), the line of succession passed back to Parantaka II's family. Rajaraja Chola I succeeded as the Chola Emperor. Madhurantaka served as an official in Rajaraja's court.

Inscriptions 

The following is an inscription of Uttama Chola from the Umamaheswaraswami temple in Konerirajapuram,

Yet another inscription of him from the Masilamanisvara temple in Tirumullaivayil,

References 

Chola kings
980s deaths
Year of birth unknown
10th-century Indian monarchs
10th-century Hindus